The year 1972 involved some significant events in television.
Below is a list of notable television-related events.

Events
January 3 – Show Boat is aired for the first time on network television, on NBC
January 21 – The first convention of Star Trek fans is held in New York City's Statler-Hilton hotel
Mid-February – John Lennon and Yoko Ono co-host an entire week on The Mike Douglas Show
February 19 – Sammy Davis Jr. makes a guest appearance on All in the Family
March 18 – After losing a 15-year court battle over the legality of its business relationship with The Herald-Traveler, CBS' Boston, Massachusetts affiliate WHDH-TV Channel 5 signs off the air. At 3 a.m. on March 19, WCVB takes over the Channel 5 frequency, simultaneously switching affiliations to the ABC network following CBS' loss of interest in the channel during the long legal wrangle.
March 27 - The Amateur's Guide to Love begins on the air, making it CBS' first attempt to make a game show since 1968 when To Tell the Truth go off the air. It eventually failed.
April 4 – After a three-year courtship, Emily Nugent married Ernest Bishop on Coronation Street.
May – The Tonight Show Starring Johnny Carson permanently relocates its production from New York City to the NBC studios in Burbank, California. (The Tonight Show would remain there until relocating back to New York in February 2014)
July 21 – Victoria Wyndham makes her first appearance as vixen (and later, good girl) Rachel Davis on the soap opera Another World.
August 1 – Three years after it was first filmed, the Israel Broadcasting Authority finally agrees to screen Barricades, a controversial documentary film that offered a sympathetic portrayal of Palestinians expelled from their homes in the 1948 Arab-Israeli War.
August 26 – Effective with this issue, TV Guide discontinues the practice of using a "C" to indicate color programs, and instead starts using a "BW" for monochrome, saving a lot of printer's ink in the process.  At the time about half of the TV households in the U.S. had color sets.
September 1 - A day for CBS' daytime lineup could be described as anything but uneventful. CBS airs reruns of popular primetime shows, The Lucy Show, The Beverly Hillbillies and My Three Sons for the final time, as reruns dominating CBS' daytime lineup (it was a tradition since 1959). The following Monday, all three shows moved to syndication.
September 4 – Another eventful day for CBS' daytime schedule. The Price Is Right premieres on CBS. To date, it is the longest running game show on American television. The Joker's Wild and Gambit also debuted, bringing game shows back to CBS' schedule in a more successful attempt than The Amateur's Guide to Love, which was cancelled on June 23, and it replaced the morning reruns dominated by CBS' daytime lineup (it was a staple since 1959).
September 9 – The Lawrence Welk Show opens its 18th season on location in Hawaii.
October 27 – The 5000th episode of Captain Kangaroo airs.
November 8 – Home Box Office (HBO) is launched, in Wilkes-Barre, Pennsylvania.
November 21 – In the second part of a two-part story which began the previous week, Beatrice Arthur's character, Maude Findlay, on the television sitcom Maude, decides to go through with an abortion, in a move that shocked CBS executives and Maude advertisers.  (Rue McClanahan made her first appearance as Vivian Cavender in this two-parter; she would become a regular cast member the following season.)
December 31
ORTF 3ème Chaîne launches in France for the first time. 
The first installment of Dick Clark's New Year's Rockin' Eve airs on NBC, beginning a yearly tradition of Dick Clark-hosted New Year's specials.

Programs

60 Minutes (1968–)
About Safety (1972–1973)
All in the Family (1971–1979)
All My Children (1970–2011)
American Bandstand (1952–1989)
Another World (1964–1999)
As the World Turns (1956–2010)
Blue Peter (UK) (1958–)
Bonanza (1959–1973)
Bozo the Clown (1949–)
Candid Camera (1948–)
Captain Kangaroo (1955–1984)
Columbo (1971–1978)
Come Dancing (UK) (1949–95)
Coronation Street (UK) (1960–)
Crossroads (UK) (1964–1988, 2001–2003)
Dad's Army (UK) (1968–1977)
Days of Our Lives (1965–)
Devilman (Japan) (1972–1973)
Dixon of Dock Green (UK) (1955–1976)
Doctor Who (UK) (1963–1989, 1996, 2005–)
Emmerdale Farm (1972–)
Face the Nation (1954–)
Four Corners (Australia) (1961–)
General Hospital (1963–)
Grandstand (UK) (1958–2007)
Gunsmoke (1955–1975)
Hallmark Hall of Fame (1951–)
Hawaii Five-O (1968–1980)
Hee Haw (1969–1993)
Here's Lucy (1968–1974)
Ironside (1967–1975)
It's Academic (1961–)
Jeopardy! (1964–1975, 1984–)
Kashi no Ki Mokku (Adventures of Pinocchio) (Japan) (1972)
Kimba the White Lion (1966–1967), re-runs
Laugh-In (1968–1973)
Leave It To Beaver (1957–1963)
Lost In Space (1965–1968)
Love is a Many Splendored Thing (1967–73)
Love of Life (1951–1980)
Love, American Style (1969–1974)
Magpie (UK)(1968–1980)
Mannix (1967–1975)
Marcus Welby, M.D. (1969–1976)
Mary Tyler Moore (1970–77)
Masterpiece Theatre (1971–)
McCloud (1970–1977)
McMillan & Wife (1971–1977)
Meet the Press (1947–)
Mission: Impossible (1966–1973)
Monday Night Football (1970–)
Monty Python's Flying Circus (UK) (1969–1974)
Old Grey Whistle Test (UK) (1971–1987)
One Life to Live (1968–2012)
Opportunity Knocks (UK) (1956–78)
Panorama (UK) (1953–)
Play for Today (UK) (1970–1984)
Play School (1966–)
Rainbow (1972–1992)
Room 222 (1969–1974)
Search for Tomorrow (1951–1986)
Sesame Street (1969–)
Soul Train (1971–)
The Benny Hill Show (1969–1989)
The Brady Bunch (1969–1974)
The Carol Burnett Show (1967–1978)
The Dean Martin Show (1965–1974)
The Doctors (1963–1982)
The Doris Day Show (1968–1973)
The Edge of Night (1956–1984)
The Flip Wilson Show (1970–1974)
The Good Old Days (UK) (1953–1983)
The Guiding Light (1952–2009)
The Late Late Show (Ireland) (1962–)
The Lawrence Welk Show (1955–1982)
The Mike Douglas Show (1961–1981)
The Mod Squad (1968–1973)
The Money Programme (UK) (1966–)
The New Dick Van Dyke Show (1971–1974)
The Newlywed Game (1966–1974)
The Odd Couple (1970–75)
The Partridge Family (1970–1974)
The Price Is Right (1972–)
The Secret Storm (1954–1974)
The Sky at Night (UK) (1957–)
The Sonny & Cher Comedy Hour (1971–1974)
The Today Show (1952–)
The Tonight Show Starring Johnny Carson (1962–1992)
The Wonderful World of Disney (1969–1979)
This Is Your Life (UK) (1955–2003)
Tom and Jerry (1965–1972, 1975–1977, 1980–1982)
Top of the Pops (UK) (1964–2006)
Truth or Consequences (1950–1988)
What the Papers Say (UK) (1956–)
Where the Heart Is (1969–1973)
World of Sport (UK) (1965–1985)
Z-Cars (UK) (1962–1978)

Debuts
January 4 – Des chiffres et des lettres on ORTF 2ème Chaîne in France (1972–)
January 13 – Me and the Chimp on CBS (1 season)
January 14 – Sanford and Son on NBC (1972–1977)
January 15 – Emergency! on NBC (1972–1977)
March 13 – Number 96 on Australia's 0–10 Network (1972–1977)
April 4 – John Craven's Newsround (now titled Newsround) on BBC1
April 7 – Ultraman Ace on TBS in Japan (1972–73)
June 21 – The Super (1972–1972) on ABC.
June 22 – The first Tattslotto draw on HSV-7 Melbourne
July 5 – Tony Bennett at the Talk of the Town on Thames Television (first and only series)
July 8 – Android Kikaider on TV Asahi (formerly NET) (1972–1973)
August 16 – About Safety on PBS
September 4 – The New Price Is Right (1972–present), The Joker's Wild (1972–1975, 1977–1986), and Gambit (1972–1976) all on CBS. Any Number, Bonus Game, and Double Prices were the three games played on the first episode of The New Price Is Right, which loses the "New" by mid-1973, and is currently television's longest running game show in history, having started its 43rd season in September 2014.
September 8 – Are You Being Served? (1972–1985) on BBC1
September 9 
 Runaround on NBC (1972–1973)
 Fat Albert and the Cosby Kids (1972–1984) and The New Scooby-Doo Movies (1972–1973) both on CBS
September 11 – Mastermind (1972–97, 2002–) on BBC1; The Rookies (1972–1976) on ABC
September 12 
 Maude, a spinoff of All in the Family on CBS (1972–1978) 
 Temperatures Rising on ABC (1972–1974)
September 13 
The Julie Andrews Hour on ABC; although only on for one season, it won seven Emmy Awards including Best Musical Variety Series.
The Paul Lynde Show (1972-1973) on ABC.
September 14 – The Waltons on CBS (1972–1981)
September 15 – Ghost Story on NBC (1972–1973)
September 16 
 The Bob Newhart Show (1972–1978) and Bridget Loves Bernie (1972–1973) on CBS
 The Streets of San Francisco on ABC (1972–1977)
September 17 
 M*A*S*H on CBS (1972–1983)
 The Adventures of Black Beauty (1972–74) on ITV
 October 2 –  The Stanley Baxter Picture Show (1972–75) on ITV
October 3 – 4 Country Reporter on then-CBS affiliate KDFW Channel 4 (now a Fox O&O station); in 1986, the show moves into first-run syndication under the new name Texas Country Reporter, eventually airing nationally on the RFD-TV satellite/cable channel (the show will mark 35 years on television)
October 14 – Kung Fu on ABC (1972–75)
October 16 – Emmerdale Farm starts transmissions in the daytime on ITV (1972–)
October 19 – Prisoner-of-war drama 
Colditz on BBC1
The Beachcombers (1972–1989) and This Is the Law (1972–1976) both on CBC
Canada AM on CTV (1972–)
November 4 – Great Performances on PBS (1972–)

Ending this year

Births

Deaths

Television debuts
Margaret Avery – Something Evil
Ned Beatty – Footsteps
John Candy – Cucumber
Ian Holm – BBC Play of the Month
Timothy Hutton – The Magical World of Disney

See also
 1972–73 United States network television schedule

References